Farnsworth Peak is a peak located on the northern end of the Oquirrh Mountain range, approximately  south east of Lake Point, Utah and  south west of Salt Lake City, Utah, United States. The mountain is named for Philo Farnsworth, the inventor of the first completely electronic television. It is used mainly for radio and television transmission, but could potentially become part of a ski resort owned by nearby Kennecott Land. On the eastern side of the mountain, the land is completely private, and access is restricted. The peak can be reached by hiking from the Tooele side, which is mostly public land. The Bureau of Land Management land extends from Ridge Peak west to the base of the mountain. Public access to this land is available off SR-36 near Lake Point, Utah. Several cattle gates need to be opened and closed, but are access roads to hiking, mountain biking, and horseback riding areas.

Radio and television use

Farnsworth Peak, in local radio terms, refers to three separate radio transmitter sites. They are known as "Big Farnsworth," "The KSTU Site," and "Little Farnsworth."
Each site hosts a number of transmission towers which broadcast radio and television stations. Extensive studies of RF radiation from the site were conducted in 2003 in an effort to aid engineers who work on the mountain.

FM Terrestrial stations with transmitters on Farnsworth Peak
Farnsworth Peak contains a vast majority of Salt Lake FM signals. The following is a complete list of FM stations with transmitters located on (or around) Farnsworth Peak.

FM amateur (ham) radio repeaters on Farnsworth Peak 
Local television networks KSL-TV, KSTU and other sites on Farnsworth Peak have provided space for amateur radio repeater operation. Farnsworth peak serves as a major hub, connecting western and southern Utah to the Utah Intermountain Intertie main hub repeater a top the Snowbird Tram on Hidden Peak.

Television stations
Farnsworth Peak is home to several full service television stations. KSL-TV is perhaps the best known transmitter site on the mountain, but the peak houses transmitters for KSTU-TV, the local Fox affiliate, KUCW (The CW), and KUTV (CBS) among others. KTMW, an independent station and KUPX, the local Ion affiliate, now broadcast their digital signals from Little Farnsworth Peak about 0.45 miles to the south. KSL-TV was the first television station to use the mountain for broadcasting. It also is responsible for transmitters on the mountain, having engineers on site for periods of time in case of emergencies. A large number of the television stations located on the peak previously carried their analog signals from the same sites. Farnsworth Peak was one of the first places in the United States to construct a facility specifically for digital television transmission.
Specifically, Farnsworth Peak houses transmitters for the following stations:

Lightning incident
On September 13, 2009, lightning struck the tower carrying a majority of the area's digital television signals. The lightning strike took eight stations in total off the air, and damaged the combiner for the tower. According to the engineers on site, the combiner was leaking oil. The lightning strike of the tower also caused a failure of the waveguide switch control system, which caused it to display improperly. A waveguide switch is part of the transmission circuitry. An engineer on site was able to correct that situation within hours, but the combiner would not be working for a few more hours. By the next day, the problem had been fixed and the stations were back on the air and all were in working order.

2020 Salt Lake City Earthquake
A number of radio and television stations experienced interruptions after power was lost on the mountain, but were able to return to air within seconds. Farnsworth Peak has generators for emergencies.

See also

 List of mountains in Utah
 Oquirrh Mountains
 Lake Point, Utah

References

External links

Mountains of Utah
Mountains of Salt Lake County, Utah
Mountains of Tooele County, Utah
Mass media in Salt Lake City